Lingen Nuclear Power Plant is an inactive nuclear power plant in Germany, close to Emsland Nuclear Power Plant. It was constructed between 1964 and 1968 as a demonstration of safe and reliable nuclear power. Operation began on 1 October 1968.

It once belonged to VEW, and now belongs to RWE Power AG.

The plant was permanently shut down in 1977.

References 

Former nuclear power stations in Germany
RWE
Buildings and structures in Lower Saxony
Nuclear power stations with closed reactors
Economy of Lower Saxony